This is a timeline documenting events of jazz in the year 2021.

Events 

January 14 – The 2020 NPR Music Jazz Critics Poll rates Maria Schneider's Data Lords as the best album of 2020.
July 30-August 1 – The Newport Jazz Festival takes place in the US state of Rhode Island. Performers include Gerald Clayton, Charles Lloyd, Mavis Staples, Trombone Shorty, Kamasi Washington and Brandee Younger.
 December 4 - Promises (Floating Points, Pharoah Sanders and the London Symphony Orchestra album) is named album of the year 2021 by TIME magazine

Albums

January

February

March

April

May

June

July

August

September

October

November

December

Deaths
January 6 – Bobby Few, 85, American jazz pianist
January 17 – Sammy Nestico, 96, American composer and arranger
January 20 – Keith Nichols, 75, British instrumentalist and bandleader (COVID-19)
January 23 – Jonas Gwangwa, 83, South African jazz trombonist
February 9 – Chick Corea, 79, American pianist, composer and bandleader
February 12 – Milford Graves, 79, American drummer and polymath
March 2 – Chris Barber, 90, British bandleader and trombonist
March 7 – Josky Kiambukuta, 72, Congolese singer (TPOK Jazz)
March 8 – Julien-François Zbinden, 103, Swiss composer and jazz pianist
March 10 – János Gonda, 89, Hungarian jazz pianist
March 19 – Cristián Cuturrufo, 48, Chilean jazz trumpeter (COVID-19)
March 28 – Malcolm Cecil, 84, British jazz bassist and record producer
April 7 – Sonny Simmons, 87, American jazz saxophonist
May 8 – Curtis Fuller, 88, American jazz trombonist
May 15 – Mario Pavone, 80, American jazz bassist, composer and bandleader
June 21 – Nobuo Hara, 94, Japanese saxophonist
July 4 – Rick Laird, 80, Irish jazz bassist (Mahavishnu Orchestra)
July 31 – Jerzy Matuszkiewicz, 93, Polish jazz musician and composer
August 28 – Francesc Burrull, 86, Spanish musician and composer
September 16 –George Mraz, 77, Czech-American jazz bassist
September 28 - Dr. Lonnie Smith, 79, American jazz Hammond B3 organist
October 18 – Franco Cerri, 95, Italian jazz guitarist.
November 1 – Pat Martino, 77, American jazz guitarist.
November 18 - Slide Hampton, 89, American jazz trombonist, composer and arranger.
December 8 - Barry Harris, 91, American jazz pianist, bandleader, composer, arranger, and educator

See also

 List of 2021 albums
 List of jazz festivals
 List of years in jazz
 2020s in jazz
 2021 in music

References

External links 

2020s in jazz
Jazz
Jazz